Bushy Park is a forest located on the west coast of the North Island of New Zealand, at 791 Rangitatau East Road,  from Kai Iwi, Whanganui, Manawatū-Whanganui region. It features an Edwardian-era homestead, Bushy Park Homestead, which is a Category I heritage building registered with Heritage New Zealand, a predator-free native bird sanctuary, and a virgin rainforest. According to Forest & Bird, Bushy Park is considered to be amongst the 25 best restoration ecology projects in Australia and New Zealand.

History
Built by Russell and Bignell in 1906 at a cost of £4,566 for G. Frank Moore, a cattle and racehorse breeder, the residence and park were given to the Royal Forest and Bird Protection Society of New Zealand by Moore in 1962.

The homestead, bird sanctuary, and rain forest have been managed by Bushy Park Homestead and Forest Trust since 1994. The Bushy Park Festival, an annual event on the Sunday of Wellington Anniversary weekend, is the major fundraising event for the trust.

During the period of 2004 to 2005, a  pest-exclusion fence was built around the park and two aerial drops of rodent bait occurred later in 2005. The opening of Bushy Park’s kiwi creche, also in 2005, was marked by the arrival of a female kiwi chick from the Waimarino Forest.

Flora and fauna
A network of ten forest paths traverse the forest reserve that includes mahoe, mamaku, pukatea, rātā, and rimu along with colonies of ferns and mosses. A feature of the reserve is a large northern rātā Metrosideros robusta named Ratanui ("Big Rata"). It is estimated to be between 500 and 1000 years old.

Avifauna species include korimako, kererū, toutouwai, tīeke, and tūī, as well as the kārearea, pīwakawaka, riroriro, mallard, pūkeko, tauhou, and matuku moana. 

In May 2022, a flock of 52 whiteheads (pōpokotea) were translocated from Waitahinga Reserve to Bushy Park.

Giraffe weevils, glowworms, and huhu beetles also inhabit Bushy Park.

References

Forests of New Zealand
Wildlife sanctuaries of New Zealand
Nature reserves in New Zealand
Rainforests
Bird sanctuaries
Whanganui District
Protected areas of Manawatū-Whanganui
Forest reserves